Venna Lake is one of the tourist attractions of Mahabaleshwar in Maharashtra state in India. The lake was constructed by Shri Appasaheb Maharaj, who was Raja (King) of Satara in 1842.

The lake is surrounded by trees. Tourists can enjoy a boat ride over the lake or a horse ride next to the lake. A number of small eateries line the banks of the lake.

References 

Venna-Lake
http://www.panchgani.net/venna-lake

Lakes of Maharashtra
Mahabaleshwar
1842 establishments in British India